Frederick George Bamford (10 April 1887 – 30 March 1955) was an Australian rules football player at the Fitzroy Football Club in the Victorian Football League (VFL). He became a premiership player at Fitroy, playing in the 1916 VFL Grand Final, under the captaincy of Wally Johnson, with George Holden as coach. Bamford made his debut against  in Round 5 of the 1911 VFL season, at the Brunswick Street Oval.

References

External links
 

1887 births
Fitzroy Football Club players
Fitzroy Football Club Premiership players
South Bendigo Football Club players
Australian rules footballers from Bendigo
1955 deaths
One-time VFL/AFL Premiership players